Coronation Airport  is located  south of Coronation, Alberta, Canada.

References

External links
Page about this airport on COPA's Places to Fly airport directory

Registered aerodromes in Alberta
County of Paintearth No. 18